Mostafa Hamdy (born 18 January 1972 in Cairo) is an Egyptian sport shooter. He competed in the men's skeet event at the Summer Olympics in 1996, 2000, 2004, 2012, and 2020.

Olympic results

References

Egyptian male sport shooters
1972 births
Living people
Olympic shooters of Egypt
Shooters at the 1996 Summer Olympics
Shooters at the 2000 Summer Olympics
Shooters at the 2004 Summer Olympics
Shooters at the 2012 Summer Olympics
Shooters at the 2020 Summer Olympics
21st-century Egyptian people